This is a comprehensive listing of official releases by Boomkat, an American electronic/pop band. They have released two studio albums, one extended play, five singles and five music videos on DreamWorks Records and Little Vanilla Records. Boomkat's debut studio album Boomkatalog.One (2003) was considered a commercial success. Their second studio album A Million Trillion Stars was released in March 2009.

Albums

Studio albums

Extended plays

Singles

Music videos

Soundtracks

References

Discographies of American artists

Pop music group discographies